Songs About You is the seventh studio album by American country music singer Brett Eldredge. The album was released on June 17, 2022, via Warner Music Nashville.

Content
Prior to the release of the album, Eldredge told Billboard that he was inspired by some of his favorite albums by artists such as Ray Charles, Frank Sinatra, and Nat "King" Cole, and that said albums made him want to place increased prominence on his vocals. Nathan Chapman, Dave Cobb, Mark Trussell, and Jordan Reynolds alternated as producers. Eldredge co-wrote every song on the album, collaborating with Heather Morgan on eight of them. The album's lead single is its title track, which was released to country radio in February 2022.

Critical reception
Rating it four out of five stars, Stephen Thomas Erlewine of AllMusic wrote, " he knows how to modulate his delivery so he not only keeps the melody in the forefront but he can also steer the listener through slow patches with an easy grin. That gift makes Songs About You an endearing country-pop record". An uncredited review from Off the Record UK stated, "ows an artist fully comfortable, finally, with his own sonic identity – imbibing many influences from jazz to soul to country, seamlessly, without losing any of his own charm and character."

Track listing

Personnel
Adapted from liner notes.

Musicians
Roy Agee – trombone (tracks 1, 10)
Brian Allen – bass guitar (track 11)
Rahsaan Barber – alto saxophone (tracks 1, 10)
Sarah Buxton – background vocals (tracks 9, 12)
Nathan Chapman – bass guitar (tracks 1–4, 10), drums (track 4)
Dave Cobb – acoustic guitar (track 11)
Evan Cobb – tenor saxophone (tracks 1, 10)
Kris Donegan – guitar (track 12)
Nathan Dugger – electric guitar (tracks 2, 6–8), guitar (track 9)
Emmanuel Echem – trumpet (tracks 1, 10)
Stanton Edward – baritone guitar (track 4), electric guitar (tracks 1–4, 10) 
Brett Eldredge – lead vocals (all tracks), background vocals (track 7)
Ian Fitchuk – piano (track 12)
Kevin Gatzke – baritone saxophone (tracks 1, 10)
Tony Lucido – bass guitar (tracks 6–9)
Paul Moak – keyboards (tracks 7, 8)
Heather Morgan – background vocals (tracks 1, 3, 4, 7, 8, 10)
Chris Powell – drums (track 11)
Dustin Ransom – keyboards (tracks 6, 9)
Jordan Reynolds – acoustic guitar (track 12), dobro (track 12), keyboards (track 12), drum programming (track 12), background vocals (track 12)
Mike Rojas – B-3 organ (tracks 1–4, 10), mellotron (tracks 2, 3), piano (tracks 1–3, 10), Wurlitzer (track 2)
Aaron Sterling – drums (tracks 1–4, 6, 9, 10), percussion (tracks 1–4, 10)
John Thomason – bass guitar (track 12)
Phillip Towns – keyboards (track 11)
Mark Trussell – acoustic guitar (tracks 5–8), bouzouki (track 8), electric guitar (tracks 6–8), drum programming (tracks 6, 7), hi-string guitar (track 8), keyboards (tracks 6, 7), resonator guitar (track 8), slide guitar (track 11), background vocals (tracks 6–9)
Ben West – keyboards (track 2)
Nir Z. – drums (tracks 7, 8)

Production
Dave Cobb – producer (track 11)
Nathan Chapman – producer (tracks 1–4, 10)
Jordan Reynolds – producer (track 12)
Mark Trussell – producer (tracks 5–9)

Chart performance

References

2022 albums
Brett Eldredge albums
Warner Records albums
Albums produced by Dave Cobb
Albums produced by Nathan Chapman (record producer)